A Pale View of Hills (1982)  is the first novel by Nobel Prize–winning author Kazuo Ishiguro. It won the 1982 Winifred Holtby Memorial Prize. He received a £1000 advance from publishers Faber and Faber for the novel after a meeting with Robert McCrum, the fiction editor.

A Pale View of Hills is the story of Etsuko, a middle-aged Japanese woman living alone in England, and opens with discussion between Etsuko and her younger daughter, Niki, about the recent suicide of Etsuko's older daughter, Keiko.

Plot summary
During a visit from her daughter, Niki, Etsuko reflects on her own life as a young woman in Japan, and how she left that country to live in England.  As she describes it, she and her Japanese husband, Jiro, had a daughter together, and a few years later Etsuko met a British man and moved with him to England. She took her elder daughter, Keiko, to England to live with her and the new husband. When Etsuko and her new husband have a daughter, Etsuko wants to call her something "modern" and her husband wants an Eastern-sounding name, so they compromise with the name "Niki", which seems to Etsuko to be perfectly British, but sounds to her husband at least slightly Japanese.

In England, Keiko becomes increasingly solitary and antisocial. Etsuko recalls how, as Keiko grew older, she would lock herself in her room and emerge only to pick up the dinner-plate that her mother would leave for her in the kitchen.  This disturbing behavior ends, as the reader already has learned, in Keiko's suicide.  "Your father," Etsuko tells Niki, "was rather idealistic at times...[H]e really believed we could give her a happy life over here... But you see, Niki, I knew all along.  I knew all along she wouldn't be happy over here."

Etsuko tells her daughter, Niki, that she had a friend in Japan named Sachiko.  Sachiko had a daughter named Mariko, a girl whom Etsuko's memory paints as exceptionally solitary and antisocial.  Sachiko, Etsuko recalls, had planned to take Mariko to America with an American soldier identified only as "Frank".  Clearly, Sachiko's story bears striking similarities to Etsuko's.

Characters
Etsuko – main protagonist; middle-aged Japanese woman
Keiko – Etsuko's elder daughter who commits suicide
Niki – Etsuko's second daughter, by her English husband
Sachiko – woman known to Etsuko, and, possibly, a third person on whom Etsuko projects bad memories, thoughts, and events
Mariko – Sachiko's daughter, and, possibly, a representation of Etsuko's daughter, Keiko
Jiro – Etsuko's first husband
Ogata-san – Jiro's father
Frank – man that Sachiko was going to America with
Mrs. Fujiwara – the owner of noodle shop who gave Sachiko a job
Hanada – Jiro's friend who threatened his wife with a golf club
Shigeo Matsuda – a student in Ogata-san's class

Reception 
The novel was generally well received by critics, many praising the novel's mysterious tone. The New York Review of Books called it "eery and tenebrous. It is a ghost story but the narrator does not realise that." The New York Times said the novel was "infinitely ... mysterious", and the inconsistent tone of the narrator, with the graphic imagery in the book combined to create "the absolute emblem of our genius of destruction".

References

Further reading
 Faber and Faber, Faber Book Club: A Pale View of Hills by Kazuo Ishiguro. Retrieved 27 June 2010.

External links
Kazuo Ishiguro discusses A Pale View of Hills with Malcolm Bradbury - a British Library sound recording

1982 British novels
Novels by Kazuo Ishiguro
Novels set in Japan
Faber and Faber books
Fiction with unreliable narrators
1982 debut novels
Japan in non-Japanese culture